Vachellia chiapensis is a species of leguminous tree in the family Fabaceae. It is found only in Mexico.

References

chiapensis
Flora of Mexico
Least concern plants
Taxonomy articles created by Polbot